Valle Castellana is a village and comune in the Province of Teramo, in the Abruzzo region of central Italy.  It is a member of the Italian community of surrounding mountain villages, Monti della Laga. It is located in the natural park known as the Gran Sasso e Monti della Laga National Park.

Geography
The comune takes its name from the Castellana River, which travels north towards Ascoli Piceno in the Marche region.  From here it joins the Tronto River before eventually leading out to the Adriatic Sea.

The comune is bordered by Accumoli, Acquasanta Terme, Amatrice, Arquata del Tronto, Ascoli Piceno, Campli, Civitella del Tronto, Rocca Santa Maria, Torricella Sicura.

History 
Some literary scholars have put forth the hypothesis that the Castellano River is the same "fiume Verde" (Verde River) where Manfred of Sicily is claimed to have been buried in the Divine Comedy of Dante.  The Castellana River basin, along with the Montagna dei Fiori formed the northernmost portion of the Kingdom of Naples.

See also
Castel Manfrino

Notes and references